Leela is a 2016 Indian Malayalam satirical film directed and produced by Ranjith. The film is an adaptation of a short story by the same name by Malayalam screenwriter Unni R. which was published in Mathrubhumi weekly. Biju Menon plays the lead role, while Vijayaraghavan, Suresh Krishna, Indrans, Sudheer Karamana, Parvathy Nambiar, Jagadish, and Priyanka play supporting roles.

The movie was released on 22 April 2016. It is the first Malayalam film in history to make its international premiere online on the same day of its theatrical release.

Plot 
The film is a black comedy drama set in South Kerala, the film follows the protagonist Kuttiyappan (Biju Menon) who is on a delirious mission. He is assisted by his trusted aide (Vijayaraghavan), Kuttiyappan travels in search of a woman who can fulfill his desires. He is in search of a prime tusker for being a part of his sexual fantasy. The journey explores characters Kuttiyappan meets and events in these intersections. Kuttiyappan finds his requirements. He feels pity for a woman he chooses and decides to marry her. But unfortunately the elephant he bought for the time kills that woman. The story cuts through open spaces of abuse and ego's as a knife through butter in a divergent manner.

Cast 

 Biju Menon as Kuttiyappan
 Vijayaraghavan as Gopinathan Pillai Nair/Pillechan
 Indrans as Dasappappi 
 Parvathy Nambiar as Leela
 Jagadeesh as Thankappan Nair
 Suresh Krishna as Devassi
 Sudheer Karamana as Thommichan
 Muthumani as Angel
 Parvathi T as Padmini
 Kavitha Nair as Usha
 Priyanka Nair as CK Bindu
 Kochu Preman as Dr. Sukumaran
 Valsala Menon as Kumarakom Nalini
 Santhakumari as Chengalam Omana
 VK Sreeraman as Soman Muthalali
 Pauly Valsan as Eliyamma
 Kottayam Purushan as Rama Panikker
 Adinad Sasi as Jabbar
 Chithira rose mathew as Pillechan's daughter
 Sini Abraham as Vilasini (Rama Panikker's wife)

Release

The film was released throughout India on 22 April 2016. It was also available to watch online through Reelax, an online streaming website, thus becoming the first film in the history of Malayalam cinema to be released online on the day of its theatrical release.

Online piracy issue

On 26 April 2016, four days after the film released in theatres and online, it was shared publicly on peer-to-peer (torrent) file-sharing websites. According to Malayala Manorama, the film was also shared across various social media profiles and was consequently downloaded 'thousands of times since its upload.' Commenting on the issue, the scriptwriter of the film, Unni R, said, "We don't know who all are behind uploading the pirated version of the movie on internet. But they will be arrested soon."

Subsequently, the film's director, Ranjith, took to his social media account to request call for action against the culprits. "We have come to the notice that the print of the movie 'Leela' is being shared in couple of Facebook pages and sites. We strongly condemn this act. We have already reported this to the Police authorities and would like to inform that strong action will be taken against the culprits [sic]," he said in his Facebook post.

References

External links 

2016 films
2010s Malayalam-language films
Films directed by Ranjith